Dylan Garner (born November 11, 1998) is an American professional stock car racing driver. He competes part-time in the NASCAR K&N Pro Series West, driving the No. 50 Toyota Camry for Bill McAnally Racing.

Racing career
Garner began racing in the SPEARS SRL Limited Late Model Division in 2014 on a limited basis, running a handful of series races. His true rookie season came in 2015, in which he won the series championship, winning three of ten races in which he competed.

NASCAR
In his early NASCAR career, Garner competed primarily in his home state of California. He won NASCAR California State rookie honors at the Whelen All-American Series level in 2016. In 2017, Garner ranked tenth nationally in the series' late model division points standings, scoring 21 top-fives and 27 top-tens in 27 combined starts at Irwindale Speedway and Kern County Raceway Park. 

Garner began the 2018 season as one of 21 semifinalists for seven spots in the 2018 Kulwicki Driver Development Program. His 2018 series schedule included 19 races, 15 of which saw him finish in the top-ten. He began the season as a 2019 program semifinalist as well, though he eventually accepted a part-time drive in the NASCAR K&N Pro Series West.

K&N Pro Series
On March 30, 2019, Garner made his debut in the K&N Pro Series West for Bill McAnally Racing (BMR), driving the No. 50 Toyota Camry at Irwindale. He scored a top-ten on debut for the team, finishing ninth in the race. Garner returned to BMR for the races at Roseville and Kern County.

Personal life
Garner is from Yorba Linda, California. He is the youngest of three children. With the Garner family originally hailing from Canada, Dylan was the only one of the three born in the United States. Garner is a third-generation driver; his grandfather, Doug, competed in CASCAR while his father, Brad, began assisting Doug with building his cars at the age of 14.

Motorsports career results

Career summary

NASCAR
(key) (Bold – Pole position awarded by qualifying time. Italics – Pole position earned by points standings or practice time. * – Most laps led.)

K&N Pro Series West

References

External links
 
 

Living people
1998 births
People from Yorba Linda, California
Racing drivers from California
NASCAR drivers